Wake the Dead is the second studio album by Canadian hardcore punk band Comeback Kid. The album was released on February 22, 2005. Bill Stevenson recorded it over 13 days at the Blasting Room in Ft. Collins, Colorado. The album's main hit, the title track "Wake The Dead", was featured on the soundtrack of the video game Burnout Revenge, and Burnout Legends. The album peaked at number 16 on Top Heatseekers and number 27 on Top Independent Albums. It was the final album with Scott Wade on vocals, with Andrew Neufeld taking over on the later releases.

Track listing

Personnel
Credits adapted from the liner notes of Wake the Dead.
Comeback Kid
 Scott Wade – lead vocals
 Jeremy Hiebert – lead guitar, backing vocals
 Andrew Neufeld – rhythm guitar, backing vocals
 Kevin Call – bass
 Kyle Profeta – drums

Other contributors
 Russ Rankin – additional vocals on 'Our Distance'
 Bill Stevenson – production, engineering
 Jason Livermore – production, engineering
 Alan Douches – mastering
 Jeremy Wabiszczewicz – layout, art

References

Comeback Kid albums
2005 albums
Victory Records albums
Albums produced by Bill Stevenson (musician)